Charlie Telfer (born 4 July 1995) is a Scottish midfielder who plays for Airdrieonians.

He began his career with Rangers before a transfer to Dundee United in June 2014. He joined Livingston on loan in January 2016 for the rest of the 2015–16 season. After he was released by Dundee United, he joined Dutch club Almere City in August 2017. He returned to Scotland in 2018, spending one season at Greenock Morton, before joining Falkirk in 2019. After bring released from Falkirk at the end of the 2021/2022 season he then signed for Airdrieonians in September 2022.

Telfer represented Scotland at under-17, under-19 and under-21 level.

Early life
Telfer was born in Carluke and grew up supporting Rangers. He joined the club as a youth player after being spotted at a Football in the Community course at Bell College, Hamilton, when he was eight.

Club career

Rangers
After progressing through the Rangers academy, Telfer signed his first professional contract with the club in November 2011. He would make one competitive first team appearance for the club against Stenhousemuir in April 2014. On 13 May 2014, he was in the Rangers side that won the Scottish Youth Cup beating Hearts 8–7 on penalties following a 2–2 draw, at St Mirren Park. Telfer later describe playing in the Scottish Youth Cup Final as his biggest game of his life.

At the end of the 2013–14 season, Telfer's future at Rangers appeared to be in doubt when Dundee United were reported to be keen to sign him. Dundee United then made a £50,000 bid to sign Telfer, which was rejected by Rangers, who offered him a new contract.

Dundee United
After rejecting the offer of a new contract with Rangers, Telfer signed for Dundee United in June 2014, with a compensation payment still to be agreed between the clubs. Telfer's departure from Rangers was commented on by the club's manager Ally McCoist, who described him as a "great prospect" and said that the club had wanted to keep him but it had been Telfer's decision to leave. The level of compensation to be paid was set by an independent tribunal, with Dundee United paying £200,000 to Rangers in January 2015.

He made his Dundee United debut as a substitute against Aberdeen in the opening match of the 2014–15 season, and scored his first goal for the club in a 3–0 win over St Mirren on 1 November 2014. Telfer was named as SPFL Young Player of the Month for November 2014. On 1 January 2015 he scored United's sixth goal in a 6–2 Dundee derby victory over local rivals Dundee. This was followed by two goals against Motherwell later that month. Telfer was a substitute for the 2015 Scottish League Cup Final, but was unused as Dundee United lost 2–0 to Celtic. He made 25 appearances and scored 4 times in his first season at the club.

Having been unable to gain a regular place in the Dundee United team, Telfer moved on loan to Scottish Championship side Livingston in January 2016 until the end of the 2015–16 season.

Telfer was released by United on 5 June 2017.

Almere City
Telfer signed for Dutch club Almere City in August 2017 on a one-year contract.

He had been training with Dumbarton and Bolton Wanderers; rejecting a contract at the Macron Stadium to move to the Netherlands.

Greenock Morton
Telfer signed a one-year contract with Scottish Championship club Greenock Morton in June 2018. He went on to make 29 league appearances, 24 of them in the starting line-up. Morton manager Jonatan Johansson and his assistant Peter Houston walked out on the club before the final game of the season in May 2019, claiming that chairman Crawford Rae had told them not to select Telfer, as one further appearance would trigger an automatic contract extension. Rae subsequently suggested that Telfer could still be offered a new contract once a replacement manager was appointed.

Falkirk
On 18 June 2019, Telfer signed for Falkirk on a two-year contract. At the end an injury-hit 2020–21 season, Telfer signed a further one-year contract with the club. After three years at Falkirk, he left at the end of his contract in May 2022.

Airdrieonians
Following a trial spell with Airdrieonians, Telfer signed a contract with the club in September 2022.

International career
Telfer has represented Scotland at under-17, under-19 and under-21 level.

Career statistics

Honours

Club
Rangers
 Scottish Youth Cup: 2013-14
Dundee United
 Scottish Challenge Cup: 2016-17

Individual
SPFL Young Player of the Month: November 2014

References

External links

1995 births
Footballers from South Lanarkshire
Almere City FC players
Association football midfielders
Dundee United F.C. players
Eerste Divisie players
Expatriate footballers in the Netherlands
Greenock Morton F.C. players
Living people
Livingston F.C. players
People from Carluke
Rangers F.C. players
Scottish expatriate footballers
Scottish footballers
Scottish Professional Football League players
Scotland under-21 international footballers
Scotland youth international footballers
Falkirk F.C. players
Airdrieonians F.C. players